2018 Shenzhen Open may refer to:

2018 ATP Shenzhen Open, an ATP World Tour tennis tournament
2018 WTA Shenzhen Open, a WTA Tour tennis tournament

See also
 2018 Shenzhen Open – Singles (disambiguation)
 2018 Shenzhen Open – Doubles (disambiguation)